Crocetin glucosyltransferase (crocetin GTase, UGTCs2) is an enzyme with systematic name UDP-glucose:crocetin 8-O-D-glucosyltransferase. This enzyme catalyses the following chemical reaction

 (1) UDP-glucose + crocetin  UDP + beta-D-glucosyl crocetin
 (2) UDP-glucose + beta-D-glucosyl crocetin  UDP + bis(beta-D-glucosyl) crocetin
 (3) UDP-glucose + beta-D-gentiobiosyl crocetin  UDP + beta-D-gentiobiosyl beta-D-glucosyl crocetin

In Crocus sativus this enzyme esterifies a free carboxyl group of crocetin or crocetin glycosyl ester.

References

External links 

EC 2.4.1